William McMahon McKaig (July 29, 1845 – June 6, 1907) was an American politician.

Born in Cumberland, Maryland, McKaig attended the Carroll School and the Allegany County Academy.  He studied law and was admitted to the Allegany bar in 1868. He moved to the Colorado Territory in 1873, but later returned to Maryland. He was appointed city attorney of Cumberland in 1876, and was elected to the Maryland House of Delegates in 1877.  He was also elected to the Maryland State Senate in 1887, and as mayor of Cumberland in 1890. In 1890, McKaig was elected as a Democrat to the Fifty-second and Fifty-third Congresses from the sixth district of Maryland, and served from March 4, 1891, until March 3, 1895. He was not a candidate for renomination in 1894, and resumed the practice of his profession. He died in Cumberland, and is interred in Rose Hill Cemetery.

References

1845 births
1907 deaths
19th-century American politicians
Burials at Rose Hill Cemetery (Cumberland, Maryland)
Maryland city attorneys
Democratic Party members of the United States House of Representatives from Maryland
Maryland lawyers
Democratic Party Maryland state senators
Mayors of Cumberland, Maryland
Democratic Party members of the Maryland House of Delegates
Lawyers from Cumberland, Maryland